Bihar Excise (Amendment) Act, 2016 is an Act of Bihar Legislative Assembly which prohibits manufacturing, bottling, distribution, transportation, accumulation, possession, purchase, sale or consumption of any type of liquor, intoxicating substance including bhang and medicines with alcoholic substance. The Act prescribes stringent punishment including capital punishment to those manufacturing or trading illicit liquor.

On 30 September 2016, the Patna High Court struck down the Act, deeming it 'illegal'.

See also
2016 Bihar hooch tragedy

References

External links

Government of Bihar
State legislation in India
Bihar
Alcohol law in India
2016 in Indian law